The 464th Troop Carrier Group was a theater airlift unit of the United States Air Force during the Cold War. It served in the United States under Tactical Air Command between 1953 and 1957.  The group operated Fairchild C-119 Flying Boxcar and Fairchild C-123 Provider aircraft as the flying element of the 464th Troop Carrier Wing until being inactivated when the wing was reorganized.

The group was first organized in 1943 in the United States Army Air Forces as the 464th Bombardment Group.  During World War II. the group served in the Mediterranean Theater of Operations with Consolidated B-24 Liberator heavy bombers.  It was awarded the Distinguished Unit Citations for attacks on marshaling yards near Vienna, Austria in July 1944 and on an oil refinery near Pardubice, Czechoslovakia (now the Czech Republic) in August 1944.  After V-E Day, the group moved to the Caribbean, where it was assigned to Air Transport Command and participated in the return of military personnel to the United States until it was inactivated in July 1945.

History

World War II

The 464th Bombardment Group (Heavy) was activated on 1 August 1943 at Wendover Field, Utah as a Consolidated B-24 Liberator heavy bombardment unit.  The group's squadrons were the 776th, 777th, 778th and Bombardment Squadrons. After gathering its initial cadre, the group moved to Gowen Field, Idaho for training with II Bomber Command. After training in Idaho and Utah, the group began its move to the Mediterranean Theater of Operations in February 1944.

The 464th deployed to southern Italy in February 1944, where it was assigned to Fifteenth Air Force's 55th Bombardment Wing. The air echelon trained for a few weeks in Tunisia before joining the remainder of the group in Italy and entering combat in April.

The group engaged in long range strategic bombing missions to enemy military, industrial and transportation targets in Italy, France, Germany, Austria, Hungary, Romania, and Yugoslavia, bombing railroad marshaling yards, oil refineries, airdrome installations, heavy industry, and other strategic objectives.

Notable missions of the Oil Campaign of World War II included Operation Tidal Wave, bombing of the Concordia Vega Refinery near Ploiești on 18 May 1944, the marshaling yards and oil refinery at Vienna on 8 July 1944, for which the group was awarded the Distinguished Unit Citation, and the Pardubice oil refinery and nearby railroad tracks on 24 August 1944, for which it also was awarded a Distinguished Unit Citation.

The group sometimes engaged in support and interdiction operations. It supported Allied forces during Operation Dragoon, the invasion of Southern France in August 1944. It hit railroad centers to assist the advance of Red Army in southeastern Europe in March 1945. It bombed enemy supply lines to assist the advance of US Fifth and British Eighth Army in northern Italy in April 1945. In January 1945, the various units that had been supporting the 464th at Pantanella Airfield were reorganized into the 517th Air Service Group.

After V-E Day, the group was assigned to the Green Project, the movement of troops from Europe to the United States via the South Atlantic Transport Route. B-24s were modified with sealed bomb bays, removal of all defensive armament and internal fuselage equipped with seating to carry approximately 30 personnel. It was assigned to Air Transport Command at Waller Field, Trinidad. The group moved personnel from Natal, Brazil and Atkinson Field, British Guiana to Morrison Field, Florida. It provided air transport until the end of July when the unit was inactivated.

Cold War

The group was redesignated the 464th Troop Carrier Group and activated at Lawson Air Force Base, Georgia.  on 1 February 1953. It was assigned to the 464th Troop Carrier Wing under the Wing Base organization system. The group replaced the 434th Troop Carrier Group, a reserve unit that had been called to active duty for the Korean War.  It took over the personnel and Curtiss C-46 Commando and Fairchild C-119 Flying Boxcar aircraft of the 434th.

The unit provided tactical airlift of troops and cargo, participated in joint airborne training with Army forces, and took part in tactical exercises in the United States and overseas. The wing provided aeromedical airlift and flew humanitarian missions as required.  The group was inactivated in 1957, when Tactical Air Command converted its flying wings to the dual deputy organization.,

The group was redesignated the 464th Tactical Airlift Group in inactive status on 31 July 1985.

Lineage
 Constituted as the 464th Bombardment Group (Heavy) on 19 May 1943
 Activated on 1 August 1943
 Redesignated 464th Bombardment Group, Heavy on 29 September 1944
 Inactivated on 31 July 1945
 Redesignated 464th Troop Carrier Group, Medium on 16 December 1952
 Activated on 1 February 1953
 Inactivated on 11 November 1957
 Redesignated 464th Tactical Airlift Group on 31 July 1985

Assignments
 II Bomber Command, 1 August 1943
 55th Bombardment Wing, 2 October 1943
 Caribbean Wing, Air Transport Command, 1 June – 31 July 1945
 464th Troop Carrier Wing]], 1 February 1953 – 11 November 1957

Components
 776th Bombardment Squadron (later 776th Troop Carrier Squadron): 1 August 1943 – 31 July 1945, 1 February 1953 – 11 November 1957
 777th Bombardment Squadron (later 777th Troop Carrier Squadron): 1 August 1943 – 31 July 1945, 1 February 1953 – 11 November 1957
 778th Bombardment Squadron (later 778th Troop Carrier Squadron): 1 August 1943 – 31 July 1945, 1 February 1953 – 11 November 1957
 779th Bombardment Squadron (later 779th Troop Carrier Squadron): 1 August 1943 – 31 July 1945, 8 June 1955 – 1 August 1957

Awards and campaigns

Stations

 Wendover Field, Utah, 1 August 1943
 Gowen Field, Idaho, 22 August 1943
 Pocatello Army Air Field, Idaho, 2 October 1943 – 9 February 1944
 Pantanella Airfield, Italy, March 1944
 Gioia del Colle Airfield, Italy, 21 April 1944

 Pantanella Airfield, Italy, c. 1 June 1944 – c. May 1945
 Waller Field, Trinidad, 1 June – 31 July 1945
 Lawson Air Force Base, Georgia, 1 February 1953
 Pope Air Force Base, North Carolina, 21 September 1954 – 11 November 1957

Aircraft
 Consolidated B-24 Liberator, 1943–1945
 Curtiss C-46 Commando 1953–1954
 Fairchild C-119 Flying Boxcar 1953–1957
 Fairchild C-123 Provider 1955–1957

See also
 List of United States Air Force Groups
 B-24 Liberator units of the United States Army Air Forces

References

Notes
 Explanatory notes

 Citations

Bibliography

 
 
 

 Further reading
 Hill, Michael. The 464th Bomb Group in World War II: In Action over the Third Reich with the B-24 Liberator. Atglen, Pennsylvania: Schiffer Publishing, 2002. .

Military units and formations of the United States in the Cold War
Troop carrier groups of the United States Air Force
Military units and formations in British Guiana in World War II
Military units and formations established in 1943
Military units and formations disestablished in 1945
Military units and formations established in 1953
Military units and formations disestablished in 1971